Ectopopterys is a genus in the Malpighiaceae, a family of about 75 genera of flowering plants in the order Malpighiales. Ectopopterys contains only one species (Ectopopterys soejartoi) of woody vines native to lowland wet forests of Colombia, Ecuador, and Peru.

References
Anderson, W. R. 1980. Ectopopterys, a new genus of Malpighiaceae from Colombia and Peru. Contributions from the University of Michigan Herbarium 14: 11–15.

External links
Malpighiaceae Malpighiaceae - description, taxonomy, phylogeny, and nomenclature
Ectopopterys

Malpighiaceae
Malpighiaceae genera
Monotypic Malpighiales genera